The Licking River is a partly navigable,  tributary of the Ohio River in northeastern Kentucky. The river and its tributaries drain much of the region of northeastern Kentucky between the watersheds of the Kentucky River to the west and the Big Sandy River to the east.  The North Fork Licking River, in Pendleton County, Kentucky, is one of its tributaries.  The South Fork Licking River, in counties including Harrison County, Kentucky, is another.

Origin of name

The Native Americans of the area called the river Nepernine. When the explorer Thomas Walker first saw it in 1750, he called it Frederick's River. An earlier name given by hunters and frontiersmen, Great Salt Lick Creek, makes reference to the many saline springs near the river that attracted animals to its salt licks. The origin of the present name is unclear, though likely related to the previous name.

History
Numerous Native American tribes inhabited the watershed for at least part of the year for several thousand years; Native American tribes that frequently hunted in and around the Licking River valley included the Shawnee and Cherokee. Other, older settlements of unnamed groups in Bath County on Slate Creek are also known. The river served as an important transportation and trade route for both Native Americans and, from the mid-18th Century on, colonists of European descent who began pushing into the area (predominantly from Virginia, Maryland and the Carolina colonies).

In 1780, during the Revolutionary War, a group of American frontiersmen under George Rogers Clark gathered at the river's mouth for their march up the valley of the Little Miami River, where they conducted operations against British outposts and British-supported Native American tribes, including elements of the Shawnee, Miami, Mingo and Delaware. In 1782, the river was the site of the Battle of Blue Licks. The Newport Barracks in Newport guarded its mouth from 1803 to 1894.

The Licking River is now used extensively for recreation, including shallow-draft boating, canoeing and fishing. It is used for rowing practice by the Cincinnati Junior Rowing Club.

Course

The Licking River rises in the Cumberland Plateau of eastern Kentucky, in southeastern Magoffin County (37°31'16"N 82°55'56"W) at the confluence of two smaller streams and an elevation of 1006 feet. It flows northwest in a highly meandering course past Salyersville and West Liberty. In Rowan County in the Daniel Boone National Forest it is impounded to form the large Cave Run Lake reservoir. It joins the Ohio opposite Cincinnati, where it separates the cities of Covington and Newport. The river was used as the southwestern border of the original Mason County and is the southwest border of Fleming and Rowan counties today.

Flora and fauna

The river is considered by ecologists to provide a unique ecosystem in the region. The lower river is considered to be a habitat for the relatively rare native muskellunge. The river basin supports several other fish species, including: redside dace, mimic shiner, streamline chub, slender madtom, blue sucker, paddlefish, and eastern sand darter. There are more than 50 species of freshwater mussels, of which 11 are endangered. The watershed provides wetland stopover habitats for about 250 species of migratory birds, an unusually high number. Several state and federal agencies, as well as private organizations such as The Nature Conservancy work to protect the diversity of this important habitat.

The largest common carp taken in the state of Kentucky (54 lbs., 14 oz.) was caught in the South Fork of the Licking River.

See also

List of rivers of Kentucky

References

External links

Nature Conservancy: Licking River
Pre-Wisconsin Spillways along the Licking River
Scenes along the Licking River

Rivers of Magoffin County, Kentucky
Rivers of Morgan County, Kentucky
Rivers of Rowan County, Kentucky
Rivers of Nicholas County, Kentucky
Rivers of Robertson County, Kentucky
Rivers of Pendleton County, Kentucky
Rivers of Kenton County, Kentucky
Rivers of Campbell County, Kentucky
Rivers of Fleming County, Kentucky
Geography of Cincinnati